Major-General Edward Temple Leigh Gurdon  (20 October 1896 – 15 December 1959) was a British Army officer.

Military career
Gurdon was commissioned into the  East Yorkshire Regiment in 1914 but transferred to the Rifle Brigade (The Prince Consort's Own) on 12 May 1915, during the First World War. His service in the war was mainly in the East African campaign and he ended the war in 1918 having been mentioned in dispatches and awarded the Military Cross (MC).

He remained in the army during the difficult interwar period and was made Private Secretary to Robert Coryndon, then the Governor of Uganda, from 1919−1920. He transferred to the Black Watch in 1922 and was married in 1923. He attended the Staff College, Camberley from 1929−1930 and returned there, this time as an instructor, a few years later.

He served in the Second World War as commanding officer of the 1st Battalion, the Black Watch from 1940, as commander of the 25th Infantry Brigade from January 1941 and as Brigadier on the General Staff at Eastern Command in India in August 1942 before becoming Director of Military Training at Army Headquarters India in April 1943.

After the war he became General Officer Commanding the 49th (West Riding) Infantry Division in September 1945 and General Officer Commanding, Salisbury Plain District in January 1947 before retiring in October 1948.

References

Bibliography

External links
Generals of World War II

1896 births
1959 deaths
Military personnel from Middlesex
British Army major generals
British Army generals of World War II
Companions of the Order of the Bath
Commanders of the Order of the British Empire
Recipients of the Military Cross
Rifle Brigade officers
Black Watch officers
British Army personnel of World War I
East Yorkshire Regiment officers
People educated at Rugby School
Graduates of the Royal Military College, Sandhurst
Graduates of the Staff College, Camberley